Manin is a surname. In Slavic countries it is used for males, while the feminine counterpart is Manina. Notable people with the surname include:
Christophe Manin (born 1966), French cyclist
Daniele Manin (1804–1857), Italian statesman and patriot of the period of Italian unification
Ludovico Manin (1725–1802), last Doge of Venice
Tamara Manina (born 1934), Russian gymnast and sports scientist
Tunka Manin (1010–1078), ruler of the Ghana Empire
Yuri Manin (1937–2023), mathematician